This is a list of mountain ranges of South Africa.

Physiography
The list includes chains of mountains bordered by highlands or separated from other mountains by passes or valleys. Some ranges in South Africa are relatively isolated, while others are physiographically part of larger geographical ranges such as the Drakensberg.

Geology
Individual mountains within the same mountain range do not necessarily have the same geology; for example, in the  Witwatersrand there is Pilanesberg, a mountain having a different orogeny from the main range and its subranges.

Geologically, many ranges are part of the Cape Fold Belt system, a wide geological system that also includes the Drakensberg.

List of mountain ranges of South Africa

See also 
Geography of South Africa
List of mountains in South Africa
Kaapvaal craton

References

South Africa, Lists of mountain ranges
Mountain ranges